Miss Baby Sol is a Zairean-English singer and songwriter. She was born in Zaire (now the Democratic Republic of the Congo) and resides in London.

Musical career
In 2011, Miss Baby Sol released her debut EP, which included three singles, "Always", "No No" and "She Cries". "She Cries" was released in support of the efforts of Amnesty International to stop rape as a weapon of war as well as in recognition of its part in establishing the International Criminal Court.

Songwriting
In addition to her solo projects and charity work, Baby has collaborated and worked with a number of people in her capacity as a songwriter. These include her chart topping collaboration, as co-writer and vocalist, with UK dance producer Redlight as well as the 2014 campaign single for No More Page 3 "Now’s The Time".

Session vocalist
As a backing/session vocalist, Miss Baby Sol has worked with Paloma Faith, Rebecca Ferguson, Florence and The Machine, The Noisettes, ROX, Laura Mvula and STINKAHBELL, among others.

Discography
 NMP3 feat Miss Baby Sol "Now the Time"
Baby Sol co writes the Christmas single for No More Page 3
Release date: 15-12-2014
 Torqux, Get Down
Baby Sol collaborates with Torqux on their second MTA EP Release
Release date: 23-09-2013
 Redlight, "Lost In Your Love"
Baby Sol collaborates with Redlight on his chart topping single Lost In Your Love
Release date: 02-08-2012
 Baby Sol, "She Cries" EP
Baby Sol releases She Cries in support of Amnesty International
Release date: 12-12-2011
 Baby Sol vs Stinkahbell "Always"
Baby Sol collaborates with dubstep duo Stinkahbell on the remix of "Always"
Release date: 12-09-2011
 Phil Asher & A.C. Layne feat Baby Sol, "We Can Make it Happen"
Baby Sol collaborates with house duo Phil Asher & A.C. Layne
Release date: 25-07-2011
 Shystie feat Miss Baby Sol, "TAG"
Taken from the long-awaited Shystie come back mixtape You’re Welcome
Release date: 29-04-2011
 Untold Songs: Volume One
Untold Songs Vol One compilation in conjunction with Amnesty International features Baby Sol's "No No"
Release date: 13-06-2011
 Before I Begin the Journey Baby Sol Debut EP
Baby Sol releases her 7 track limited edition debut EP
Release date: 10-01-2011
 BlackEinstein feat Miss Baby Sol, "Common Ground"
Taken from the forthcoming B.E. Bowie influenced/inspired EP “Whatever Happened To Major Tom”
Release date: 01-11-2010
 Mystro feat Baby Sol, "Don't Worry About it"
Baby Sol teams up with UK rapper Mystro on his much anticipated "Digmund Freud" EP. 
Release date: 13-09-2010
 Lazy Habits feat Baby Sol, "Memory Banks"
"Memory Banks" is the debut single from Lazy Habits. The single is released 31 May 2010. 
Release date: 31-05-2010
 Mop Mop, Ritual Of The Savage
Baby Sol teams up with Andrea Benini on his third studio album.
Release date: 09-04-2010
 Bopstar feat Baby Sol, "Material Thing"
Baby Sol collaborates with Bopstar on his first soulful house release of 2010, includes remixes from Aaron Ross and Zed Bias.
Release date: 29-03-2010
 Boot Shape feat Miss Baby Sol, "You Got Me"
Baby Sol collaborates with Italy-based producers DJ Afghan and Boot Shape on her first Tam Tam Studio release.
Release date: 29-10-2009
 SoulCulture presents: "Aaliyah Revisited"
Baby Sol and London-based producer Black Einstein team up to produce a cover of "Its Whatever" in the memory of Aaliyah Dana Haughton. 
Release date: 25-08-2009
 Ironik feat Baby Sol, "So Nice"
Taken from the debut album No Point in Wasting Tears, Baby Sol lends her soulful vocal to this melodic UK Hip Hop track.
Release date: 11-05-2009

References

Living people
21st-century Black British women singers
Singers from London
Democratic Republic of the Congo emigrants to England
Year of birth missing (living people)